Bruce Kennedy is a Canadian curler from Thunder Bay, Ontario.

Awards
Canadian Curling Hall of Fame: 1988
Northwestern Ontario Sports Hall of Fame: 1988

Teams

Personal life
He is married with Tracy Kennedy, Canadian and World curling champion. He was employed as a locomotive engineer.

References

External links
 
 Bruce Kennedy – Curling Canada Stats Archive

Living people
Canadian male curlers
Curlers from Northern Ontario
World curling champions
Brier champions
Curlers from Thunder Bay
1940s births
Train drivers